Antonio DeMarco (1 January 1898 – 14 November 1965) was an American burlesque/vaudeville dancer in the first half of the 20th century.
Performing with his wife Sally, "The Dancing DeMarcos" was an extremely successful exhibition ballroom dance team in the 1940s.

Career
DeMarco was born in Buffalo, New York, on 1 January 1898.
He was the son of a farmer, whose father had lost the family mill in Palermo through neglecting business to dance at folk festivals around Italy. 
DeMarco became a dancer despite his father's opposition.
He began his career as a solo dancer, then with partners, in burlesque and vaudeville, in the prohibition-era speakeasies.

DeMarco danced with several female partners, of whom the best known were his wives and the ballet and musical theatre star Patricia Bowman.
Tony's first wife was Nina Kroner and his second Renée.
Tony and Renee began dancing together when he was 29 and she was 16.
He was best known for his performances with his third wife, Sally Craven, a ballet dancer.
Sally Craven doubled for Vivien Leigh in the long shots of dances in Gone with the Wind (1939).

Tony DeMarco became known in 1924 with George White's Scandals. He was the dance director for Harry Carroll's Revue in 1929, and performed with Renée in the hit musical Girl Crazy  with Ginger Rogers in 1930. Renee and Antonio DeMarco appeared in 1932 in Hotcha! at the Ziegfeld Theatre. For In Caliente, the 1935 film, his partner was Sally Craven. The New York Times panned the film for its lightweight storyline, but said the dancing DeMarcos helped to make the picture entertaining.

After that Tony DeMarco was solo until 1940.
Renée filed for divorce in 1939.
In June 1941 Tony announced that Renee was leaving for Reno, Nevada, to get a divorce.
Sally Craven danced with Tony DeMarco on Broadway in Boys and Girls Together (1940–41) and Banjo Eyes (1941-42).
Tony appeared without Sally in The Gang's All Here (1943) and with her in Crazy House (1943) and Greenwich Village (1944). In the 1940s Tony and Sally DeMarco were able to make up to $4,000 per week at high-class supper clubs and hotels.
Tony DeMarco and Sally married in 1944.

Exhibition ballroom dancing fell out of vogue in the 1950s with the rise of rock and roll.
Tony and Sally still appeared several times on Ed Sullivan's Toast of the Town.
Tony took a few bit parts as a TV actor.
DeMarco died in Palm Beach, Florida, on 14 November 1965.

Work
DeMarco introduced comic patter and classical music to exhibition ballroom dancing.
He brought back the image of a sensuous seducer that was the signature of Rudolph Valentino.
The "Dancing DeMarcos" were one of the best known of the exhibition ballroom dance teams of the 1930s and 1940s, along with Veloz and Yolanda and Marge and Gower Champion.

Stage

1914 - Hands Up
1925 - Cocoanuts
1929 - Music Box Revue
1930 - Girl Crazy
1932 - Hot-Cha!
1935 - Jubilee!
1940 - Boys and Girls Together

Film

1935 - In Caliente
1938 - The Shining Hour
1943 - Crazy House
1943 - The Gang's All Here	 	 
1944 - Greenwich Village

References

Sources

American male dancers
1898 births
1965 deaths
American ballroom dancers
20th-century American dancers